Harold "Harry" Pantling (16 May 1891 – 21 December 1952) was an English footballer.

Career
Pantling played for Watford, Sheffield United and Rotherham United in the Football League. He also made one appearance for England. He was part of the 1925 FA Cup winning side in Sheffield United's 1–0 victory over Cardiff City at Wembley Stadium.

Honours

Club
Sheffield United
FA Cup winners: 1925

References

External links

1891 births
1952 deaths
People from Leighton Buzzard
English footballers
England international footballers
Association football defenders
Watford F.C. players
Sheffield United F.C. players
Rotherham United F.C. players
Heanor Town F.C. players
English Football League players
FA Cup Final players
Footballers from Bedfordshire